Aonla Lok Sabha constituency is one of the 80 Lok Sabha (parliamentary) constituencies in Uttar Pradesh state in northern India.

Assembly Segments
Assembly Segments are:

Members of Parliament

Election results

See also
 Bareilly district
 List of Constituencies of the Lok Sabha

External links
Aonla lok sabha  constituency election 2019 result details
 List of MP from Aonla Lok Sabha

Notes

References

sarvaraj singh was MP in 1999 from Samajwadi party

Lok Sabha constituencies in Uttar Pradesh
Politics of Bareilly district